Eberhard Friedrich Michael Rees (April 28, 1908 – April 2, 1998) was a German-American (by becoming a naturalized citizen of the United States) rocketry pioneer and the second director of NASA's Marshall Space Flight Center.

Biography
Rees was born in Trossingen, Baden-Württemberg, Germany. After studying engineering at the University of Stuttgart, and graduating from the Dresden University of Technology in 1934 with his master's degree, he worked his way to become the assistant manager of a steel mill in Leipzig, Germany. Rees arrived at the Army Research Center Peenemünde in the spring of 1939 and managed V-2 rocket fabrication and assembly.  He served as Wernher von Braun's deputy from World War II through the Apollo program.

Rees was in the first group of Operation Paperclip rocket scientists brought to the United States by the Army Ordnance Corps, arriving at Logan Field on October 2, 1945, and serving first at the Army Aberdeen Proving Grounds, then at Fort Bliss, in 1946 and in 1950, at the Redstone Arsenal.
In August 1957, his team developed the ablative heat shield.

After serving as Deputy Director of Development Operations for the Army Ballistic Missile Agency, Rees became the Marshall Space Flight Center Deputy for Technical and Scientific Matters in 1960 and directed the Lunar Roving Vehicle program.

On March 1, 1970, Rees was appointed as the Director of the Marshall Space Flight Center, in Huntsville, Alabama, as von Braun's handpicked successor, from which he managed the Skylab space station development and construction. He retired from NASA in 1973.

On April 2, 1998, Rees died in a DeLand, Florida, hospital at the age of 89.

References

1908 births
1998 deaths
People from Tuttlingen (district)
Early spaceflight scientists
American technology writers
German emigrants to the United States
German people of World War II
German rocket scientists
German spaceflight pioneers
NASA people
Directors of the Marshall Space Flight Center
People from the Kingdom of Württemberg
University of Stuttgart alumni
Operation Paperclip
Engineers from Baden-Württemberg
20th-century American scientists
Members of the American Rocket Society